Walter Ostrom  (born 1944) is a Canadian ceramic artist.

Life
He was born in Binghamton NY and is a graduate of Ohio University.  He has been a professor of Ceramics at NSCAD University since 1969.

Work
His work has been featured in collections and exhibitions worldwide, including the Canadian Museum of Civilization and the Victoria and Albert Museum, London. Ostrom lives in Lunenburg, Nova Scotia.

Awards 

 Portia White Prize (2008)
 Invested as a Member of the Order of Canada by Governor General Michaëlle Jean (2007)
 Saidye Bronfman Award for Outstanding Creativity in Craft  (2003)
 Jean A. Chalmers National Craft Award  (1995)

References

External links
 NSCAD University Bio
 Official Web Site

1934 births
Canadian ceramists
Canadian potters
Living people
Academic staff of NSCAD University